Argyrotaenia gogana is a species of moth of the family Tortricidae. It is found in North America, where it has been recorded from British Columbia, Nevada and Washington.

Adults have been recorded on wing in April and from June to July.

References

Moths described in 1907
gogana
Moths of North America